The 1920–21 Sarajevo Football Subassociation First League (Prvi razred Sarajevskog podsaveza / Први разред Сарајевског подсавеза) was the first season of the Sarajevo Football Subassociation First League. Hajduk have won the league, becoming the first ever champions of Bosnia and Herzegovina. The league was organized by the Sarajevo Football Subassociation (bosn. Sarajevski Podsavez). The league consisted of seven clubs in Sarajevo, four based on religious and ethnic affiliation: SAŠK, Građanski as Bosnian Croatian,  Slavija, Troja affiliated to Bosnian Serbs,  Bosnian Muslim's Đerzelez (also known as Sarajevski) and Makabi Sarajevo (also known as Barkohba) as Bosnian Jewish club; while only multi-ethnic was worker's club RŠD Hajduk.

Final table

References

External links
Football Association of Bosnia and Herzegovina 

Sarajevo
Sarajevo
football